Maria Light is a novel by the American writer Lester Goran set in 1940s Pittsburgh, Pennsylvania.

It tells the story of Maria Light, a recent widow in a Pittsburgh government housing project called Addison Terrace as she tries to survive, providing for her three children and her elderly father-in-law.

References

1962 American novels
Novels by Lester Goran
Novels set in Pittsburgh
Novels set in the 1940s